Serge-Junior Martinsson Ngouali (born 23 January 1992), commonly known simply as Junior, is a professional footballer who plays as a midfielder for Norwegian club Sarpsborg 08. Born in Sweden, he represents the Gabon national team.

Early life
Martinsson Ngouali was born in Gothenburg, Sweden, to a Central African father of Gabonese descent. His mother is Swedish and Serge-Junior grew up in the city of Gothenburg. Living in the suburb of Hammarkullen, he started to play football at local clubs Gunnilse IS and Västra Frölunda IF.

Together with his mother and twin brother Tom Martinsson Ngouali, also a former professional footballer, he moved to Stockholm in 2003. At age 11, he joined the academy at IF Brommapojkarna.

Career

Brommapojkarna
In 2010, he made his debut for Brommapojkarna in Allsvenskan – the Swedish top tier – at age 18. He played 12 games in the league during his debut season, as Brommapojkarna got relegated to Superettan.

He established himself as a regular starter in the central midfield position for Brommapojkarna in 2012 and 2013, only missing a few competitive games. Martinsson Ngouali soon got known for his technical gift and strong passing game.

Before the start of the 2014 season, he attracted interest from then reigning Swedish champions Malmö FF. Martinsson Ngouali opted to stay at Brommapojkarna and signed a new three-year deal with the club. He made 28 appearances for the side the same year, marking his first full season in Allsvenskan.

Martinsson Ngouali also featured in both legs against the Serie A side  Torino as Brommapojkarna got knocked out from the 2014–15 UEFA Europa League third qualifying round. In the first leg on home ground, he got fouled inside the penalty area by defender Giuseppe Vives who received a red card from the referee. Striker Dardan Rexhepi however missed the penalty and Brommapojkarna eventually lost with 0–7 on aggregate.

Brommapojkarna eventually declined and got relegated to Superettan before the start the 2015 season, where they would finish in last place. In 2016, Martinsson Ngouali scored 7 goals – a new career best – as Brommapojkarna won Division 1, the Swedish third tier.

Hammarby

2017

On 16 March 2017, he moved to the fellow Stockholm-based team Hammarby IF. Martinsson Ngouali signed a three-year deal with the Allsvenskan club. He rejoined his former manager Stefan Billborn and former teammate Pablo Piñones Arce at Hammarby, now both working as assistant managers at said club.

He made his competitive debut for the club on 3 April, on the first match day of Allsvenskan 2017. Martinsson Ngouali got sent off late in the second half as Hammarby lost 1–2 against IFK Norrköping. He scored his first goal for Hammarby on 7 May in an away fixture against Östersund, netting in a 2–1 loss. Midway through his first season at Hammarby, Junior received much praise from the club's director of football Jesper Jansson, who complimented him as a "real class player" with a strong defensive game and great ability to cover big surfaces on the pitch. On 21 August, in a 3–0 away win against Örebro SK, Martinsson Ngouali attracted a serious thigh injury that kept him out of play for almost two months. He returned to the pitch on 16 October, in a 0–2 away loss against Kalmar FF.

2018
On 12 February 2018, Junior extended his contract for another half year, with the new deal running until June 2020. He played 26 league games for Hammarby, scoring once, as the club finished 4th in the table. He suffered a serious cruciate ligament injury in October, in a 2–1 loss against Malmö FF, with an expected return in the summer of 2019. At the end of 2018, Martinsson Ngouali was voted Hammarby Player of the Year by the fans of the club and also featured in the official Allsvenskan Team of the Year.

2019
Martinsson Ngouali spent the first half of the 2019 season nursing his serious knee injury. He made his comeback on 15 September in a 6–2 home win against IFK Göteborg. He eventually played 8 games, scoring once, as Hammarby finished 3rd in the table.

2020
He had difficulties breaking into the side as a regular in 2020, as the club disappointedly finished 8th in the table. On 9 December, it was announced that Martinsson Ngouali would leave the club at the end of the year, as his contract expired.

HNK Gorica
On 15 February 2021, Martinsson Ngouali signed a one and a half-year contract with Prva HNL club HNK Gorica, linking up with Jiloan Hamad, his former teammate from Hammarby.

International career
Martinsson Ngouali won 12 caps for the Swedish under-19 national team between 2009 and 2011. On March 24, 2011, he also made a single appearance for the Swedish under-21s in a 1–3 loss against Italy.

In the summer of 2016, he was approached by the Gabonese national football team when manager José Antonio Camacho invited him to a training camp. He was eventually called up to the final squad ahead of the 2017 Africa Cup of Nations. Martinsson Ngouali made his debut for Gabon in a 1–1 draw against Burkina Faso on 18 January 2017 in said tournament.

Honours

Individual
 Hammarby IF Player of the Year: 2018

References

External links
 
 Serge-Junior Martinsson Ngouali at Brommapojkarna 
 

1992 births
Living people
Association football midfielders
Allsvenskan players
IF Brommapojkarna players
Hammarby Fotboll players
Gabonese footballers
Gabon international footballers
Swedish footballers
Sweden under-21 international footballers
Sweden youth international footballers
Gabonese people of Swedish descent
Gabonese people of Central African Republic descent
Sportspeople of Central African Republic descent
People with acquired Gabonese citizenship
Swedish people of Gabonese descent
Swedish people of Central African Republic descent
Swedish sportspeople of African descent
2017 Africa Cup of Nations players
2021 Africa Cup of Nations players
Footballers from Gothenburg